The West Banas is a river in western India. It originates from the southern Aravalli Range, in Sirohi District of the state of Rajasthan. It flows south, draining the valley between Mount Abu on the west and the easterly ridge of the Aravallis on the east through the West Banas Dam, Swarupganj and Abu Road city. It continues south through the plains of Gujarat state, flowing through Banaskantha and Patan districts to empty into Little Rann of Kutch seasonal wetland.

The watershed area of the West Banas River is approximately 1,876 square kilometres. The length of the river is 266 kilometres, of which 50 kilometres is in Rajasthan, the remaining in Gujarat.

See also 
 Banas River

References 

Rivers of Rajasthan
Sirohi district
Rivers of Gujarat
Aravalli Range
Banaskantha district
Rivers of India